Byrne Dairy is a regional dairy company headquartered in Syracuse, New York.  It was founded during the Great Depression in 1933, delivering milk bottles to New Yorkers by horse-wagons. The company is privately run and has expanded, distributing across the Upstate New York region, supplying many wholesale and retail locations. The company also has a wholesale distribution center in Massachusetts and operates a chain of convenience store/gas stations in Central New York.

In October 2012, it announced a plan to open a yogurt plant and agritourism center on a 127-acre site in Cortlandville, New York. The announcement marks Byrne Dairy's entry into the expanding central New York Greek yogurt belt, alongside Chobani, Crowley Foods, as well as Fage's presence in Johnstown.

To celebrate St. Patrick's Day, Byrne Dairy sells a green minty milk from the end of February until March 17.

See also
 Turkey Hill (company)
 Wawa

References

Wholesalers of the United States
Dairy products companies of the United States
Manufacturing companies based in Syracuse, New York
DeWitt, New York
Automotive fuel retailers
Gas stations in the United States
Convenience stores of the United States
1933 establishments in the United States
American companies established in 1933